Viktor Kokman (born March 1, 1993) is a Swedish ice hockey goaltender. He is currently playing with Storhamar Ishockey of GET-ligaen.

Kokman made his Elitserien debut playing with HV71 during the 2012–13 Elitserien season.

References

External links

1993 births
Living people
HV71 players
Sportspeople from Norrköping
Swedish ice hockey goaltenders
IF Troja/Ljungby players
HC Vita Hästen players